Michael Malloy (1873 – February 22, 1933), later known as either Mike the Durable or Iron Mike, was a homeless Irishman from County Donegal who lived in  New York City during the 1920s and 1930s. A former firefighter, he survived multiple murder attempts by five acquaintances, who attempted to commit homicide as a life insurance fraud.

Failed murder attempts

Beginning in January 1933, while Malloy was unemployed, alcoholic and homeless, five of his acquaintances  Tony Marino, Joseph "Red" Murphy, Francis Pasqua, Hershey Green, and Daniel Kriesberg (later dubbed "the Murder Trust" by the headlines)  plotted to kill Malloy by getting him to drink himself to death to collect life insurance. Presumably achieved with the aid of a corrupt insurance agent, they collected insurance policies on Malloy's life under the name Nicholas Malloy and stood to gain over  if Malloy died an accidental death.

Marino owned a speakeasy and gave Malloy an unlimited tab, thinking the alcoholic Malloy would abuse it and drink himself to death. Although Malloy drank for a majority of his waking day, it did not kill him. Marino then replaced Malloy's liquor with antifreeze, but Malloy would continue to drink with no problems. A possible explanation for the antifreeze not killing him is the fact that ethanol blocks absorption of ethylene glycol in the liver; and is used as an antidote for antifreeze poisoning. Antifreeze was replaced with turpentine, followed by horse liniment, and finally rat poison was mixed in. After these mixtures failed to kill Malloy, Marino mixed shots of wood alcohol (pure methanol) in with his normal shots of liquor. This did not kill Malloy, presumably because the normal liquor helped negate the methanol poisoning.

The group then gave Malloy raw oysters soaked in wood alcohol - the idea apparently coming from Pasqua, who claimed he saw a man die after eating oysters with whiskey. A sandwich of spoiled sardines mixed with poison and carpet tacks was then tried.

Concluding that it was unlikely that anything Malloy ingested was going to kill him quickly enough before the insurance policies ran out, the group decided to freeze him to death. On an extremely cold night, after Malloy drank until passing out, he was carried to a park, dumped in the snow, and had  of water poured on his bare chest. However, shortly thereafter, Malloy was rescued by police who took him to a homeless charity where he was re-clothed.

This put Malloy in the hospital for three weeks with broken bones. The group presumed he was dead, but they were unable to collect the policy on him.

Malloy's murder
On February 23, 1933, after he had passed out for the night, the murderers took Malloy to Murphy's room, put a hose in his mouth that was connected to the coal gas jet, and turned it on. This finally killed Malloy, with his death occurring within an hour. He was pronounced dead of lobar pneumonia and quickly buried, with Dr. Frank Manzella signing the death certificate. Police heard rumors of "Mike the Durable" in speakeasies all over town, and upon learning that a Michael Malloy had died that night, they had the body exhumed and forensically examined.

The five men were put on trial and subsequently convicted, and Dr. Manzella was held as an accessory after the fact, with a  bail. Green went to prison, while the other four members were sentenced to death and executed in the electric chair at Sing Sing in Ossining, New York: Kriesberg, Marino, and Pasqua on June 7, 1934, and Murphy on July 5, 1934.

In popular culture
A 1986 episode of Amazing Stories, called "One for the Road", is a fictionalized version of this incident, in which a group of friends conspire to kill a drunk named Mike Malloy for insurance money.
Alternative rock band Primus included the Matt Winegar-penned instrumental (which Winegar also performed) "You Can't Kill Michael Malloy" for their 1990 album, Frizzle Fry.
A 2015 episode of True Nightmares, Season 2, Episode 3 "Friends Like These", is a telling of the story of Michael Malloy and his murder.
A 2018 episode of Sam O’Nella Academy, “The Tale Of Michael Malloy”, is the telling of the story of Michael Malloy and his murder attempts through “crudely drawn educational cartoons” Sam O’Nella.

See also
 List of unusual deaths
 Grigori Rasputin (1869–1916) – a Russian mystic and self-proclaimed holy man, assassinated by a group of conservative noblemen who opposed his influence in late imperial Russia
 Angelina Rodriguez (born 1968) – an American woman, sentenced to death for the murder of her fourth husband after taking out a US$250,000 life insurance policy on him

References

Sources
 

1873 births
1933 deaths
Burials at Ferncliff Cemetery
Deaths from carbon monoxide poisoning
American firefighters
Homeless people
Irish emigrants to the United States (before 1923)
Irish expatriates in the United States
Irish people murdered abroad
People from County Donegal
People murdered in New York City
Male murder victims